The rusty carpetshark (Parascyllium ferrugineum) is a carpetshark of the family Parascylliidae found off southern Australia between latitudes 31°S and 41°S near the ocean floor on the continental shelf. It inhabits rocky reefs and seagrass beds  in depth by night, hiding in caves by day. Its length is up to  TL and it feeds on crustaceans and molluscs.

References

 Compagno, Dando, & Fowler, Sharks of the World, Princeton University Press, New Jersey 2005

External links
 
 

rusty carpetshark
Marine fish of Southern Australia
rusty carpetshark